Sayed Hafez Shehata (born 25 April 1927) was an Egyptian wrestler. He competed at the 1948 Summer Olympics and the 1952 Summer Olympics.

References

External links
 

1927 births
Possibly living people
Egyptian male sport wrestlers
Olympic wrestlers of Egypt
Wrestlers at the 1948 Summer Olympics
Wrestlers at the 1952 Summer Olympics
Place of birth missing
20th-century Egyptian people